Martin Damm and Cyril Suk were the defending champions, but competed this year with different partners.

Damm teamed up with Mariano Hood and lost in quarterfinals to Davide Sanguinetti and Rogier Wassen.

Suk teamed up with Pavel Vízner and successfully defended his title, by defeating Tomáš Cibulec and Leoš Friedl 6–3, 6–4 in the final.

Seeds

Draw

Draw

References
 Main Draw

Rosmalen Grass Court Championships
2005 ATP Tour